The R181 is a regional road in Ireland, running from the R162 near Shercock to the border with Northern Ireland near Keady, where it meets the B32.

Route 
The R181 begins on the R162 road near Shercock in County Cavan. It soon enters County Monaghan and continues to Castleblayney, where it runs along the main street before reaching a junction with the R182. It then heads to the border, which it crosses, becoming the B32, which continues to Keady.

See also 
Roads in Ireland 
Motorways in Ireland
National primary road
Regional road

References 

Roads Act 1993 (Classification of National Roads) Order 2006 – Department of Transport

Regional roads in the Republic of Ireland